The Wiener derby, or Vienna derby in English, is an association football local derby match between city rivals FK Austria Wien and SK Rapid Wien from the Austrian capital city of Vienna (Wien). The two sides are the most successful in the country, with more national titles and cups between them than any other Austrian club. They are also two of the most popular clubs in Austria, with fans across the country. They are the only Austrian sides to have never been relegated; both have been in the top flight of Austrian football since 1911, tied for the second-longest uninterrupted spell in the top flight of any club on the Continent.

The first meeting between the clubs was 8 September 1911 when Rapid beat Austria 4-1. In total 329 competitive games have been played with Rapid the victors on 137 occasions, Austria have won 117 games and 75 have ended in a draw. The fixture is the most played city derby in Europe after the Old Firm in Glasgow and the Edinburgh derby between Heart of Midlothian F.C. and Hibernian F.C. (both in Scotland).

Rivalry culture

Both clubs come from the Hietzing area, the 13th district, located in Western Vienna. Today however Austria now play at Franz Horr Stadium in the Southern Vienna area of Favoriten (district 10) while Rapid are still located in the West of the city but in nearby Penzing (district 14) at the Allianz Stadion.

Support today is mainly split along geographical divides of north and west (Rapid) and south (Austria) however both clubs have fans throughout the city and across the country. Class has been cited as a traditional means of support with Rapid being supported by the working classes while Austria were the team of the bourgeois of Vienna. Rapid were founded as First Workers Club of Wien compared with Austria who were founded as Wien Amateur Sports Society and incorporated a minimum intelligence requirement into their founding statutes. The class divisions may be coming back into play however as Rapid are currently only one of two Austrian sides run by its supporters. Austria were owned by Frank Stronach until 2008 and changed their name back from Austria Memphis Magna to Austria Wien.

Early Austrian football was dominated by clubs from Vienna and the Wien derby as it is known today was contested by many different clubs, most notably Rapid, First Vienna FC, who are located in the northern district 19 and SK Admira Vienna from district 21 also in the north of the city. The three clubs dominated Austrian football winning every title from 1927-1946 but Admira later merged with other clubs and eventually moved to Mödling, a town south of Vienna. The original Viennese club, First Vienna went into decline after the 1950s and now play outside the top flight. FK Austria became Rapid's main rival in the early 1960s as the two began to dominate Austrian football.

A heavy police presence is involved at matches to keep crowd trouble to a minimum. In 2007, four policemen were injured during fighting between supporters. In 2011 a game was abandoned after Rapid fans invaded the pitch.

Summary of results
As of 7 March 2021.

Matches list
League

This list does not contain results from Cup and Supercup competitions.

	
 	

1 Abandoned after 30 minutes - original score 2–0.
2 Austria went off after 67 minutes - original score 2–2.
3 Abandoned after 80 minutes.
4 The 12-05-1983 match was a replay after the original match held on 26-03-1983 (final result 0–1) was annulled.
5 The 22-05-2011 match was awarded to Austria by a score of 0–3.  The original match had been suspended after 26 minutes and a 0–2 lead for Austria when Rapid supporters stormed the pitch.

Top Goal scorers

Most clean sheets by goalkeeper
Statistics for league games only from 1965-66 season. Goalkeeper must play entire 90 minutes to be eligible.

Records

Results

Biggest winning margin

Highest scoring games

Trends
Most games won in a row (Rapid): 11, 1911 to 1917.
Most games won in a row (Austria): 5, 1987 to 1989.
Most games without defeat (Rapid): 17, 25 May 1996 – 9 May 2000. (including 10 victories) 
Most games without defeat (Austria): 17, 12 August 2001 – 6 August 2005. (including 6 victories)

Multiple wins in a season
From the 1911-12 season until 1973-74, the clubs played two league fixtures a season. From the 1974-75 season (excluding 3 years from 1982–85), four fixtures have taken place annually during the Bundesliga season. During the home and away format, Rapid won both games 21 times, and Austria won both fixtures on 6 occasions. Neither club has won all four derbies in the modern format.

References 

 "Austria's Green-Violet battle", fifa.com, 
 "Rapid-Austria results", rapidarchiv.at,  
 "Bundesliga Archive", bundesliga.at, http://www.bundesliga.at/archiv/index.php 

Association football rivalries
FK Austria Wien
SK Rapid Wien
1911 establishments in Austria-Hungary
Establishments in the Empire of Austria (1867–1918)